Aha Shake Heartbreak is the second studio album by American rock band Kings of Leon. It was first released in Europe on November 1, 2004, then in the United States on February 22, 2005, with alternate cover artwork. It is the only album by Kings of Leon to have a Parental Advisory label, because of profanity in "Taper Jean Girl", "Rememo", "Soft", and "Four Kicks". The U.S. album cover is reminiscent of Queen's A Night at the Opera.

"The Bucket", "Four Kicks" and "King of the Rodeo" were released as singles in the UK.

Recording
Like its predecessor, Aha Shake Heartbreak was recorded with producer Ethan Johns at his Three Crows Studio in Los Angeles using The Beatles' old Abbey Road mixing desk.

Title and artwork
The title of the album comes from the third track, "Taper Jean Girl".

There were two different covers for the album: the original UK/Ireland version of the album featured a white orchid on a black background, whereas the later US version featured a different kind of orchid on a white background. The releases of the album with a white orchid on the cover contain the bonus track "Where Nobody Knows". On compact disc, both versions of the artwork include a picture of the band as children hidden underneath the plastic tray that holds the disc.

Reception

At Metacritic, which assigns a weighted mean rating out of 100 to reviews from mainstream critics, the album has an average score of 74, based on 31 reviews, which indicates it received "generally favorable reviews". Rolling Stone listed it as the 39th best album of its decade, and it was also included in the book 1001 Albums You Must Hear Before You Die.

The band's popularity spiked in Australia during the weeks of September 22 and 29, 2008, when all four of their studio albums were in the top 50 on the charts. At that point, Aha Shake Heartbreak reached at its highest position yet, number 25, and attained Platinum sales. It was certified 2× Platinum in Australia on January 12, 2009.

The album has sold more than 910,000 copies worldwide.

Track listing
All songs written by Kings of Leon (Caleb Followill, Nathan Followill, Jared Followill, Matthew Followill) unless otherwise noted.

"Slow Night, So Long" contains an unlisted hidden track, titled "Too Good to Tango" (1:14), within the track's total run time.

Singles
 "The Bucket"
 Released: October 25, 2004
 Chart positions: #16 (UK Singles Chart)#23 (US Modern Rock)#32 (Irish Singles Chart)
 "Four Kicks"
 Released: January 10, 2005
 Chart positions: #24 (UK Singles Chart)#28 (Irish Singles Chart)
 "King of the Rodeo"
 Released: April 11, 2005
 Chart positions: #41 (UK Singles Chart)

Personnel
Kings of Leon
 Caleb Followill – vocals, rhythm guitar (credited as "pipes")
 Nathan Followill – drums (credited as "skins")
 Jared Followill – bass (credited as "slaps")
 Matthew Followill – lead guitar (credited as "licks")
 Ethan Johns – piano ("Slow Night, So Long"), keyboards ("Milk")

Charts and certifications

Weekly charts

Year-end charts

Certifications

References

2004 albums
Albums produced by Ethan Johns
Kings of Leon albums
RCA Records albums